James Stephen Karinchak (born September 22, 1995) is an American professional baseball pitcher for the Cleveland Guardians of Major League Baseball (MLB). He played college baseball at Bryant University, and was drafted by the Cleveland Indians in the ninth round of the 2017 MLB draft. He made his MLB debut in 2019.

Amateur career
Karinchak attended Valley Central High School in Montgomery, New York. Undrafted out of high school, he attended Bryant University, where he played college baseball for the Bulldogs. In 2016, he played collegiate summer baseball with the Chatham Anglers of the Cape Cod Baseball League. Karinchak was drafted by the Cleveland Indians in the ninth round of the 2017 MLB draft.

Professional career

Minor League Career 
Karinchak made his professional debut in 2017 with the Mahoning Valley Scrappers, going 2-2 with a 5.79 ERA over 23 innings. He split 2018 season between the Lake County Captains, Lynchburg Hillcats and Akron RubberDucks, combining to go 4-2 with a 1.29 ERA over  innings. He opened the 2019 season with Akron and was promoted to the Columbus Clippers early in May.

Major League Career 
On September 13, 2019, the Indians selected Karinchak's contract and promoted him to the major leagues. He made his major league debut on September 14 versus the Minnesota Twins, pitching  scoreless innings and recording three strikeouts.

With the 2020 Cleveland Indians, Karinchak appeared in 27 games, compiling a 1–2 record with 2.67 ERA and 53 strikeouts in 27 innings pitched. 

In 2021, he pitched to a 7–4 record and a 4.07 ERA with 78 strikeouts and 32 walks in  innings. 

In 2022, with the Cleveland Guardians, Karinchak accumulated a 2-0 record and a 2.08 ERA with 62 strikeouts in 39 innings pitched. Karinchak missed the first few months of the season with shoulder injury, making rehab appearances with the Columbus Clippers before returning to the major leagues on July 4th. Karinchak's 2.08 ERA was the 9th lowest among AL relievers.

Personal life
Karinchak grew up a New York Yankees fan.

References

External links

Bryant Bulldogs bio

1995 births
Living people
People from Walden, New York
Baseball players from New York (state)
Major League Baseball pitchers
Cleveland Indians players
Cleveland Guardians players
Bryant Bulldogs baseball players
Chatham Anglers players
Mahoning Valley Scrappers players
Lake County Captains players
Lynchburg Hillcats players
Akron Rubbernecks players
Columbus Clippers players